Saint-Gilles is a commune in the Manche department in Normandy in north-western France.
In 1848 John Ruskin and his new wife, the former Effie Gray, visited St Gilles. Ruskin noted "The Church of Saint Giles has some remarkable examples of the final stage of transition from flamboyant to Renaissance".

See also
Communes of the Manche department

References

Saintgilles